Lamar Lyons (born March 25, 1973) is a former American football defensive back. Lyons competed for Washington in college football. He played for the Oakland Raiders in 1996 and for the Baltimore Ravens in 1997.

Lyons joined the Oakland Raiders on May 21, 1996. He was activated from the practice squad in October. He played six games on special teams and as a reserve safety. Lyons was signed by the Ravens in December and played on special teams in the season finale.

References

1973 births
Living people
American football defensive backs
Washington Huskies football players
Oakland Raiders players
Baltimore Ravens players